Bickmore is a surname. Notable people with the surname include:

Albert S. Bickmore (1839–1914), American naturalist, a founder of the American Museum of Natural History
Barry R. Bickmore, professor in the department of geological sciences at Brigham Young University
Carrie Bickmore (born 1980), Australian radio news presenter and television presenter
Eric Bickmore (1899–1979), English schoolteacher and cricketer
Lee Bickmore (1908–1986), the CEO of Nabisco
Wendy Bickmore (born 1961), British genome biologist, Director of the MRC Human Genetics Unit at the University of Edinburgh, President of The Genetics Society
Edward Bickmore Ellison Taylor or Ted Taylor (1906–1982), New Zealand lawyer, politician and diplomat

See also
Bickmore, West Virginia, unincorporated community in Clay County, West Virginia, United States
BiCMOS
Bickmorites
Bicknor, village in Kent